Vladimir Dmitrievich Churkin (2 March 1953 – 17 April 2021) was a Soviet and Russian football player and coach.

References

1953 births
2021 deaths
Footballers from Yaroslavl
Soviet footballers
Russian footballers
FC Shinnik Yaroslavl players
Association footballers not categorized by position